The Chumbe Lighthouse is located in Chumbe Island in Zanzibar.

See also

 List of lighthouses in Tanzania

References

External links

 Tanzania Ports Authority

Swahili architecture
Lighthouses in Tanzania
Buildings and structures in Zanzibar
Lighthouses completed in 1904